The UNESCO Chairs program was conceived as a way to advance research, training and programme development in higher education by building university networks and encouraging inter-university cooperation through transfer of knowledge across borders.

History
It was established in 1992 following the decision taken at its 26th session of the General Conference of United Nations Educational, Scientific and Cultural Organization (UNESCO).

As of end of 2013, the programme involves over 854 institutions in 134 countries.

Notable people

References

External links
 List of established UNESCO Chairs

UNESCO
Professorships